The Mariamman Temple in Ho Chi Minh City, Vietnam, is a temple dedicated to the Hindu goddess Mariamman. It was built in the late 19th century by Palaniappa Thevar from Pattukkottai, Thanjavur District a trade community from Tamil Nadu, India. The temple is now under the management of the Vietnamese Indian Children brought up by Late priest Attangudi Lakshmanan Chettiar who previously used to be the priest who managed the Thenday Yutthapani Temple at 66, Ton That Thiep, Quan 1, HCMC.

Architecture
In the outer hall, Parvati's sons Ganesha and Muruga are on her right and left, respectively. The Raja-gopuram of this temple is about 12m high and contains a number of statues. Statues of Lakshmi, Murugan and other devas dot the hallways.

The main feature of the temple are the various statues of Mariamman, which surround the outer walls of the temple. These include Nataraja, Shiva, Brahma, Vishnu, Kali, Biramasakthi, Samundi, Thirumagal, Mageswari, Meenatchi, Valambigai, Andal, Kamatchiamman, Karumari-amman, Sivagami and Parvati who has Murugan in her lap.

There is also a huge mandapam or main hall inside the kovil (Temple).

Devotees

It was built at to serve the Hindu community in Vietnam. It serves around fifty Tamil families in Ho Chi Minh City. Most of the devotees are Vietnamese or Sino-Vietnamese who experienced the powers of Mariamman.

See also
Hinduism in Asia
Hinduism in Vietnam
List of Hindu empires and dynasties

References

External Links 

Hindu temples in Vietnam
Tourist attractions in Ho Chi Minh City
Hindu temples in Ho Chi Minh City
Mariamman temples
19th-century Hindu temples